Ukmergė County was one of the subdivisions of the Kovno Governorate of the Russian Empire. It was situated in the eastern part of the governorate. Its administrative centre was Ukmergė.

Demographics
At the time of the Russian Empire Census of 1897, Ukmergė County had a population of 229,118. Of these, 72.3% spoke Lithuanian, 13.2% Yiddish, 10.0% Polish, 4.1% Russian, 0.2% German, 0.1% Belarusian, 0.1% Romani and 0.1% Ukrainian as their native language.

References

 
Uezds of Kovno Governorate
Kovno Governorate